Group B of the 2004 Copa América was one of the three groups of competing nations in the 2004 Copa América. It comprised Argentina, Ecuador, Mexico, and Uruguay. Group play ran from 7 to 13 July 2004.

Mexico won the group and faced Brazil—the runners-up of Group C—in the quarter-finals. Argentina finished second and faced Peru—the runners-up of Group A—in the quarter-finals. Uruguay finished third and faced Paraguay, the winners of Group C, in the quarter-finals. Ecuador finished fourth in the group, and were eliminated from the tournament.

Standings

All times are in local, Peru Time (UTC−05:00).

Matches

Mexico vs Uruguay

Argentina vs Ecuador

Uruguay vs Ecuador

Argentina vs Mexico

Mexico vs Ecuador

Argentina vs Uruguay

External links
Copa América 2004 Official Site

Group B
Argentina at the 2004 Copa América
2004 in Ecuadorian football
2004 in Uruguayan football
2003–04 in Mexican football